The Venezuelan Democratic Unity Roundtable held state primaries in order to choose its candidates to local offices including state governors and mayors on February 12, 2012. 

According to the MUD regulations, if an incumbent gubernatorial governor decides to re-elect, he can do so without having to measure himself in primaries, unless the political forces that obtained 55% of the opposition's votes in the entity in the last parliamentary elections are against. In this way, the realization of primaries in some states currently governed by the Venezuelan opposition is not expected.

On Friday, November 4, 2011, the Bureau of Democratic Unity (MUD) decided by consensus on December 16, 2012 the candidacies in 6 states (Zulia, Lara, Táchira, Nueva Esparta, Carabobo and Amazonas) and the Metropolitan District of Caracas.

Candidates for state governors and mayors of their capitals

References

2012 in Venezuela
Primary elections in Venezuela